Kim Do-hoon (born 12 March 1989) is a South Korean professional golfer. He is also called Kim Do-hoon 752 to distinguish him from another South Korean golfer also called Kim Do-hoon, 752 being his membership number at the Korea Professional Golfers' Association. He won the 2010 Dongbu Insurance Promy Gunsan CC Open on the Korean Tour. He played on the Japan Golf Tour from 2010 to 2015.

Amateur career
In October 2006, Kim represented South Korea in the Eisenhower Trophy in South Africa where the team finished 5th. In December, he was part of the South Korean team that won the gold medal in the men's team event at the 2006 Asian Games. He finished tied third in the individual event but missed out on a bronze medal on countback.

Professional career
Kim turned professional in 2007. From 2010 to 2015, he played mostly on the Japan Golf Tour, returning to the Korean Tour in 2016. He had one win on the Korean Tour, taking the 2010 Dongbu Insurance Promy Gunsan CC Open in a playoff. He was a runner-up in the 2010 Hanyang Sujain-Pine Beach Open and in the 2015 GS Caltex Maekyung Open, an event co-sanctioned with the OneAsia Tour.

Kim's most successful season on the Japan Golf Tour was his first, 2010. He was joint runner-up in the ANA Open and lost a playoff for the Casio World Open, finishing the season 11th in the tour money list. Kim qualified for the 2011 U.S. Open through sectional qualifying in Japan and finished tied for 30th place. He was a runner-up in the 2011 Asia-Pacific Panasonic Open and was 18th in the money list, after including his U.S. Open prize money. Kim dropped to 20th in the money list in 2012 and was out of the top 50 from 2013 to 2015.

Professional wins (1)

Korean Tour wins (1)

Playoff record
Japan Golf Tour playoff record (0–1)

Results in major championships

"T" indicates a tie for a place

Team appearances
Amateur
Eisenhower Trophy (representing South Korea): 2006

References

External links

South Korean male golfers
Japan Golf Tour golfers
Asian Games medalists in golf
Asian Games gold medalists for South Korea
Golfers at the 2006 Asian Games
Medalists at the 2006 Asian Games
1989 births
Living people